The Cheere Baronetcy, of St Margaret's in the City of Westminster, was a title in the Baronetage of Great Britain. It was created on 19 July 1766 for the sculptor and civic official Sir Henry Cheere. The title became extinct on the death of the second Baronet in 1808.

Cheere baronets, of St. Margaret's (1766)
 Sir Henry Cheere, 1st Baronet (1776–1781)
 Sir William Cheere, 2nd Baronet (1781–1808) born c.1736; died 1808 age 72 at White Roding, where he was rector

References

 

Extinct baronetcies in the Baronetage of Great Britain